Iowa Highway 212 is a state highway in Iowa County, Iowa. It runs  from Iowa Highway 21 south of Belle Plaine to U.S. Highway 6 in Marengo.

Route description
The intersection features a dominant curve from southbound Iowa 21 to eastbound Iowa 212. A short connector road allows westbound Iowa 212 traffic to reach southbound Iowa 21. Northbound Iowa 21 traffic must stop at the curve in order to continue north on Iowa 21.

Heading east, Iowa 212 runs roughly parallel to the Iowa River for its entire length.  It crosses Bear Creek before entering Marengo along South Street.  At Western Avenue, Iowa 212 turns south towards U.S. Highway 6.  Just  from its eastern end, Iowa 212 crosses a single line of the Iowa Interstate Railroad.  The route ends at US 6 on the southwestern edge of Marengo.

History
The route which is now Iowa 212 was originally designated as Primary Road No. 73 (PR No. 73) in 1920.  PR No. 73 was a  route which began at the Lincoln Highway (PR No. 6) in Belle Plaine and ended at the River to River Road (PR No. 7) in Marengo.  By 1947, Iowa 73 had been renumbered Iowa 212.  The Lincoln Highway, now U.S. Highway 30 (US 30), had been relocated north of Belle Plaine.  Iowa 212 was extended west through Chelsea along the western leg of the abandoned section of US 30.  In 1980, the Lincoln Highway section of Iowa 212 was turned over to Tama County and became County Road E66.  Iowa 212 was truncated at its intersection with Iowa 21.

Major intersections

References

External links

212
Iowa County, Iowa